Gerald James Ian Ernest (born 30 August 1954) is a Mauritian Anglican bishop. In 2001 he was consecrated as the 15th bishop of Mauritius. From 2006 to 2017 he was archbishop of the Province of the Indian Ocean. Since October 2019 he has been the Archbishop of Canterbury's Personal Representative to the Holy See and Director of the Anglican Centre in Rome.

Ernest was educated at the University of Madras and ordained an Anglican priest in 1985.

In 2008 he was awarded the Cross of St Augustine, the second highest international award for outstanding service to the Anglican Communion, by the Archbishop of Canterbury.

References

1954 births
University of Madras alumni
21st-century Anglican bishops in Africa
21st-century Anglican archbishops
Anglican bishops of Mauritius
Anglican archbishops of the Indian Ocean
Living people
Recipients of the Cross of St Augustine